Amblyptilia clavata is a moth of the family Pterophoridae. It is found in Sichuan Province, China.

References
 , 2005, A review of the genus Amblyptilia Hübner (Lepidoptera: Pterophoridae) from China, with descriptions of two new species, Oriental Insects 39: 221-227.

Moths described in 2005
Amblyptilia